The men's 200 metre backstroke competition of the swimming events at the 1991 Pan American Games took place on 14 August. The last Pan American Games champion was Mike O'Brien of US.

This race consisted of four lengths of the pool, all in backstroke.

Rogério Romero won the gold medal, breaking a string of 5 U.S. titles in a row. Before him, only one other non-American had won the race; the Canadian Ralph Hutton won in 1967 in the first edition of the Games in which this race was held.

Results
All times are in minutes and seconds.

Heats

Final 
The final was held on August 14.

References

Swimming at the 1991 Pan American Games